James Jade Anthony Smith (born 17 September 1974) is a former English footballer who played as a full back. He is the assistant manager at Sheffield Wednesday.

Playing career
Born in Birmingham, Smith joined First Division Wolves as a youth trainee and progressed through the ranks to make his first team debut on 13 August 1994 in a 1–0 win over Reading. He immediately established himself as a regular and made 25 appearances in his debut professional season as Wolves lost in the play-offs.

He was more of a peripheral figure in the 1995–96 season but re-established himself in the following campaign as Wolves again lost out in the play-offs. In total, he made 104 appearances for the club before leaving in October 1997 as part of the deal that saw Dougie Freedman and Kevin Muscat move to Molineux from Premier League Crystal Palace. Palace were the only club Smith scored against for Wolves, with his goal coming in the Play-off semi final 1st leg at the end of the previous season, a tie from which Palace eventually emerged victorious.

Smith made his Palace debut as they won away to Sheffield Wednesday but got sent off in his second match against Aston Villa. He remained at Crystal Palace for seven seasons (one Premier League), racking up 175 appearances in total for the Eagles. During his time here, he was also loaned out to Fulham where he scored once against Walsall. His spell at Fulham gave Smith the distinction of having played under three England managers: Graham Taylor (Wolves), Kevin Keegan (Fulham) and Terry Venables (Crystal Palace).

The defender left Selhurst Park in August 2004, joining League One club Bristol City on a free transfer. He was a regular in his first season at the club, but ended the following season on loan at Brentford where he lost in the play-offs yet again.

He was given a free transfer upon returning to Bristol City at the end of the 2005–06 season, as he was signed by his former Brentford manager Martin Allen at the Milton Keynes Dons. He began to be often sidelined by a persistent knee injury during his spell here, and he was released by the club at the end of the season. This led to him announcing his playing retirement in July 2007.

Smith came out of retirement to sign for Halesowen Town in 2009 and at the same time was working with Airbus UK towards his coaching badges. He then moved to the Welsh Premier League side in January 2010 and registered with them as a player.

Coaching career

He was also on the coaching staff at West Bromwich Albion Academy.

Darren Moore would announce him as his assistant manager at Doncaster Rovers on 24 July 2019. He would follow Darren Moore to Sheffield Wednesday on 1 March 2021 taking on the same role as assistant manager. Following Darren Moore getting COVID-19, Smith would talk charge of match days for the games against Watford, Cardiff City and Queens Park Rangers. He would again lead the dugout after Moore suffered a setback in his recovery.

References

External links

1974 births
Living people
English footballers
Brentford F.C. players
Bristol City F.C. players
Crystal Palace F.C. players
Fulham F.C. players
Milton Keynes Dons F.C. players
Wolverhampton Wanderers F.C. players
Premier League players
English Football League players
Airbus UK Broughton F.C. players
Halesowen Town F.C. players
Cymru Premier players
Association football defenders
West Bromwich Albion F.C. non-playing staff
Doncaster Rovers F.C. non-playing staff
Sheffield Wednesday F.C. non-playing staff